Lacaugne is a commune in the Haute-Garonne department in southwestern France.

Geography
The commune is bordered by five other communes, four of them is in Haute-Garonne, and one in Ariège: Marquefave to the north, Montgazin to the northeast, Latrape to the south, Carbonne to the west, and finally by the department of Ariège to the east by the commune of Lézat-sur-Lèze.

Population

See also
Communes of the Haute-Garonne department

References

Communes of Haute-Garonne